The Corvus Racer 540 is a single-seat, low wing, high performance aerobatic aircraft produced by Corvus Aircraft Ltd in Hungary.

Design and development
The Corvus Racer 540 design was started in 2007 when Corvus Aircraft signed a contract with Red Bull to develop a new airplane for Péter Besenyei, designed especially for air racing.  It was designed by Andras Voloscsuk and the Hungarian University of Aviation.  After limited success improving the power output of the existing engine, Besenyei decided to focus on the airframe to reduce drag and improve aerodynamic efficiency.  The development engineering time was more than 15,000 hours over two years, and the result was an airplane that was "very nice, nice to control" although potentially hindered by a heavy engine.

The Corvus Racer 540 first appeared at the Apr 2009 AERO Friedrichshafen show in Germany, with initial flight testing in Feb 2010 and its racing debut in June 2010 at the Red Bull Air Race in Windsor, Ontario, Canada during the fourth race out of six in the 2010 Red Bull racing season.  Besenyei placed 10th at Windsor, 8th at New York, and 9th at Lausitz all with the Corvus Racer 540.  Unfortunately, the 7th and 8th races of the 2010 race series were cancelled and as of April 2012 the series had yet to resume, thus reducing motivation for further development of the design.

Specifications

See also
List of aerobatic aircraft

References

External links

Aerobatic aircraft
Racer 540
Low-wing aircraft
Single-engined tractor aircraft
Aircraft first flown in 2010
Conventional landing gear